Ahmed Mohammed Khalfan Al Khamisi (born 26 November 1991) is an Omani professional footballer who plays as a defender for Dhofar and the Omani national team.

International career
Al Khamisi made his senior international debut on 25 March 2021 in a friendly 1-1 draw against India.

He last appeared at the 2022 World Cup qualifying match against Japan in a 1-0 defeat, before being called up to the final 23-man squad for the 2021 FIFA Arab Cup in Qatar on 18 November 2021. He played the full match against Iraq in a 1-1 draw.

References

External links
 
 

1991 births
Living people
Omani footballers
Oman international footballers
Association football defenders
Suwaiq Club players
Dhofar Club players
Oman Professional League players
People from Sohar